Spiritual Dimensions is a double album by American jazz trumpeter Wadada Leo Smith released on Cuneiform. The first disc is the fourth release by his Golden Ensemble, which began as a quartet but here expands into a quintet with two drummers, and was recorded live at the 2008 Vision Festival in New York. The second disc is the first-ever release by Organic, an electric nine-piece band with four guitarists, and was recorded live in 2009 at the jazz club Firehouse 12 in New Haven, Connecticut.

Reception

In his review for AllMusic, arwulf arwulf notes that "Both ensembles combine swirling currents of ethereal mystery with funk tropes descended directly from the achievements of Miles Davis during the last 25 years of his life."

The Down Beat review by Kirk Silsbee says "Smith shows a marked distillation in his playing and the frameworks he chooses. He plays in short bursts and phrases, made of brilliant tones, startling sounds, pungent runs and lyrical asides."

In a review for All About Jazz Jakob Baekgaard says "Smith creates a unique world of sound where rhythms are more than mere earthly creations, but rather something which aspires to a beauty of metaphysical proportions." Another review by Raul D'Gama Rose states "Every note trumpeter Wadada Leo Smith blows on his exquisite brass instrument brings a whole world of joy." Meanwhile, Dan McClenaghan notes that "With the ambitious Spiritual Dimensions, Wadada Leo Smith has created a strangely entrancing music, and one of his finest recordings."

The PopMatters review by Will Layman states "Though Smith has never compromised his dedication to freely improvised music, his sound is engaging and easy to enjoy: tart, lyrical, often delicate, and always rich in the pregnant silences between notes.  He is, in many respects, the greatest successor to Miles Davis in his use of silence, texture, and rhythm in jazz trumpet."

The Point of Departure review by Stuart Broomer notes that "There’s plenty of depth and focus in his Golden Quintet, but the Organic concert seems to take the trumpeter to another level of interaction, with a band that's both more intense and more inventive. It's not to be missed."

Track listing
All compositions by Wadada Leo Smith
Disc One
 "Al-Shadhili's Litany of the Sea: Sunrise" - 12:57
 "Pacifica" - 5:49
 "Umar at the Dome of the Rock, parts 1 & 2" - 14:52
 "Crossing Sirat" - 6:21
 "South Central L.A. Kulture" - 15:42
Disc Two
 "South Central L.A. Kulture" - 12:37
 "Angela Davis" - 19:18
 "Organic" - 18:07
 "Joy : Spiritual Fire : Joy" - 13:34

Personnel
Golden Quintet (Dísc One)
Wadada Leo Smith - trumpet
Vijay Iyer - piano, synthesizer
John Lindberg - bass
Pheeroan akLaff - drums
Don Moye - drums

Organic (Dísc Two)
Wadada Leo Smith - trumpet
Michael Gregory (Jackson) - electric guitar (and producer of Disc Two)
Brandon Ross - electric guitar
Nels Cline - 6 and 12-string electric guitar
Lamar Smith - electric guitar (on 1 & 4)
Okkyung Lee - cello
Skúli Sverrisson - electric bass
John Lindberg - acoustic bass
Pheeroan akLaff - drums

References

2009 live albums
Wadada Leo Smith live albums
Cuneiform Records live albums